Lepidochrysops guichardi is a butterfly in the family Lycaenidae. It is found in Ethiopia. The habitat consists of open stony country.

Adults have been recorded in April.

References

Butterflies described in 1949
Lepidochrysops
Endemic fauna of Ethiopia
Butterflies of Africa